Tyntynder is a locality in the south-east of the Mallee region of Victoria, Australia. Tyntynder Football Club is an Australian rules football team in the Central Murray Football League. 

Tyntynder post office opened on 4 May 1894, then it was renamed Nyah Post Office 1 November  1894, but closed on 8 August 1944.

References

Towns in Victoria (Australia)
Rural City of Swan Hill